Thyrosticta tollini is a moth of the subfamily Arctiinae first described by Georg Adolf Keferstein in 1870. It is native to Madagascar.

This species has a wingspan of 32 mm.

References

Arctiinae
Moths of Madagascar
Moths of Africa